Crystle Danae Stewart (born September 20, 1981) is an American actress, host, model and beauty pageant titleholder who won Miss USA 2008. Stewart later began an acting career, starring as a real estate agent Leslie Morris on the OWN/TBS comedy-drama television series For Better or Worse from 2011 to 2017 and in 2018 starred in the thriller film Acrimony.

Since 2020, Stewart has also been the national director of Miss USA and Miss Teen USA. She was suspended from the position following allegations of favoritism and results rigging at Miss USA 2022.

Life and career

Early life
Stewart was born in Houston, Texas, to Robert and Cynthia Franklin Stewart. She has a brother, Robert, and a sister, Breana. She married Belgian model Max Sebrechts in August 2014.  The pair share a daughter Anne-Jolie and a son Maxime Jr.

Pageantry

Stewart won the Miss Texas USA 2008 title in a state pageant held in Laredo, Texas on July 1, 2007, after competing against 121 other contestants. She represented Texas in the Miss USA 2008 pageant held in April 2008. Stewart graduated from Elkins High School in Missouri City, and graduated from the University of Houston in 2007. Additionally, Stewart graduated from Barbizon Modeling and Acting School in Houston.

This was Stewart's fifth attempt at the Miss Texas USA title; she had placed first runner-up in both the 2006 and 2007 events; third runner-up in 2005; and made the semi-finals in 2003. Her first appearance in the state pageant was in 2002 when she made the semi-finals of the Miss Texas USA 2003 pageant competing as Miss Fort Bend County. In 2004, Stewart again competed as Miss Fort Bend County and placed third runner-up to Tyler Willis at Miss Texas USA 2005. The following year, she competed in the Miss Houston local pageant and placed first runner-up to Lauren Lanning. She competed at Miss Texas USA 2006 as Miss Harris County, and placed first runner-up to Lanning for the second time. In 2006, she placed first runner-up to Miss Houston for a second time and, in a double repetition, placed first runner-up to Miss Houston, Magen Ellis, in the 2007 state pageant (competing as Miss Southeast Texas).

In 2007, she did not compete for a local title, and instead entered as an at large delegate for Miss Texas USA 2008, again holding the Miss Fort Bend County title. She made the final two in the state-televised pageant, alongside Miss Houston Brooke Daniels, who was also a runner-up at Miss Texas USA 2007. This time Stewart won the title and was crowned Miss Texas USA 2008. She also won the Everything but Water Swimsuit award, announced during the preliminary competition. Stewart is the second African American to win the crown at Miss Texas USA; Chelsi Smith was crowned Miss Texas USA 1995 (and later Miss USA and Miss Universe).

On April 11, 2008, Stewart represented Texas in the Miss USA 2008 pageant where she became the ninth Texan to win the Miss USA title. Throughout her reign she served for various charities, conducted media interviews and made other public appearances. On 26 April, she attended the White House Correspondents' Association dinner.

Stewart holds a degree in consumer science and merchandising from the University of Houston. Stewart is represented as a model by Neal Hamil Agency in Houston.

 On July 13, 2008, Stewart represented the US at the Miss Universe pageant Nha Trang, Vietnam, and advanced to the top 10. Stewart became the second consecutive Miss USA, following Rachel Smith in 2007, to stumble and fall during the evening gown competition. After that, she encouraged the audience to applaud by clapping her hands. Unlike Smith, Stewart did not advance to the top five, finishing eighth overall.

In 2020, Stewart became the national director of Miss USA and Miss Teen USA, splitting the pageants into a new independent organization away from the Miss Universe Organization. In October 2022, Stewart and her company Miss Brand Corporation were suspended from their roles in organizing pageants after numerous allegations of rigging were leveled by former contestants.

Hosting
Stewart hosted the Miss Teen USA 2009 competition on July 31, 2009, along with Seth Goldman. On July 24, 2010, Goldman and Stewart once again hosted the Miss Teen USA pageant.

Stewart also co-hosted multiple Miss Texas USA pageants including some with her Belgian-born husband, model  (married August 9, 2014), and she also co-hosted with Jason Feinberg.

Stewart served as a finals judge at the Miss USA 2016 pageant on June 5, 2016, in Las Vegas, Nevada.

Acting
In 2011, Stewart made her acting debut appearing in an episode of the Tyler Perry sitcom House of Payne. That same year, Perry cast her as a series lead in the TBS/OWN comedy-drama series For Better or Worse playing the role of Leslie Morris for its six-season run. In 2012, Perry cast Stewart in her first film, playing the role of a secretary in Good Deeds. Again in 2017, cast her as a series regular in the short-lived TLC drama series Too Close to Home. In 2018, she was cast in Perry's thriller Acrimony.

In addition to her roles in Tyler Perry productions, Stewart appeared in one episode of the television series The Exes.

Filmography

References

External links

 
Miss Texas USA official website
Crystle Stewart's modeling agency portfolio site

1981 births
Living people
Miss USA 2008 delegates
Miss USA winners
Miss Universe 2008 contestants
African-American female models
African-American actresses
American actresses
American female models
People from Houston
University of Houston alumni
African-American beauty pageant winners
21st-century African-American women
21st-century African-American people
20th-century African-American people
20th-century African-American women